Salvia radula is a herbaceous perennial native to the northern provinces of South Africa, growing at elevations from . Leaves are wooly and white underneath. It is closely related to Salvia disermas.

Notes

External links
IPNI Page

radula
Flora of the Northern Provinces